Roland Weißpflog (born 13 November 1942) is a German former skier. He competed in the Nordic combined events at the 1964 Winter Olympics and the 1968 Winter Olympics.

References

External links
 

1942 births
Living people
German male Nordic combined skiers
Olympic Nordic combined skiers of the United Team of Germany
Olympic Nordic combined skiers of East Germany
Nordic combined skiers at the 1964 Winter Olympics
Nordic combined skiers at the 1968 Winter Olympics
People from Limbach-Oberfrohna
Sportspeople from Saxony